This is a list of Yes Minister and Yes, Prime Minister episodes.

Thirty-eight episodes were made in total, running from 1980 to 1988. This includes a one-hour special that aired in 1984.  All other episodes were a half-hour in length.  The dates listed are when a particular episode was first transmitted on BBC2.

Yes Minister (1980–1984)

Series 1 (1980)

Series 2 (1981)

Series 3 (1982)

Christmas sketch (1982)
A two-minute Christmas-themed sketch, featuring only Eddington, Hawthorne and Fowlds, was aired on BBC One as part of a 1982 Christmas special titled The Funny Side of Christmas.

Christmas Special (1984)

Yes, Prime Minister (1986–1988)

Series 1 (1986)

Series 2 (1987–88)

Yes, Prime Minister (2013)
In January 2013, a new series of Yes, Prime Minister was launched on the Gold television channel.

References

External links
 Episode list for "Yes Minister" at IMDb
 Episode list for "Yes, Prime Minister" at IMDb

 
 
Yes Minister and Yes, Prime Minister episodes